Subrat Kumar Acharya (born 1 November 1951) is a gastroenterologist  and liver transplant physician, a physician scientist, a prolific writer and a passionate teacher. Acharya is well known for his compassion and patient-centric approaches in treating complex diseases. 

Acharya is also a teacher. He has trained many young doctors who now carry his legacy forward around the world. After providing almost 40 years of public service at AIIMS, New Delhi, he now serves as the Pro Chancellor KIIT University Bhubaneswar and HOD Gastroenterology and Hepatology PBMH KIMS(KIIT University, Bhubaneswar) and Executive Director of Gastroenterology and Hepatology at Fortis Flt. Lt. Rajan Dhall Hospital, Vasant Kunj, New Delhi.

In 2012 he was appointed director of AIIMS, Bhubaneswar, but chose to continue his service as the Head of the Department of Gastroenterology at AIIMS New Delhi.

Awards
 Padma Shree, 2014
 Mitra Olympus Endoscopy Award
 P N Berry Award
 Commonwealth Medical Fellowship Award
 Om Prakash Memorial Award
 Best Young Investigator Award by Asia-Pacific Association for Study of the Liver
 Samanta Chandrasekhar Award, 2003

References

External links
 Educational Qualification
 Prof. (Dr.) Subrata Kumar Acharya Nominated AIIMS-BBS President

1951 births
Living people
Recipients of the Padma Shri in medicine
People from Balasore
Indian gastroenterologists
20th-century Indian medical doctors
Medical doctors from Odisha